Ohno Dam  is a gravity dam located in Kyoto Prefecture in Japan. The dam is used for flood control and power production. The catchment area of the dam is 354 km2. The dam impounds about 186  ha of land when full and can store 28550 thousand cubic meters of water. The construction of the dam was started on 1957 and completed in 1960.

See also
List of dams in Japan

References

Dams in Kyoto Prefecture